Zoltán Baksa (born 2 January 1983) is Hungarian footballer who currently plays for Cigánd SE in the Hungarian Third Division, voted as the best player of the club in 2011. He usually plays as a midfielder. He is well known football player in his native land in Transcarpathia. CONIFA World Cup 2018 champion as a team captain of Transcarpathia.

Honours

National
CONIFA World Cup:
 Champion (1): 2018

Club
Hungarian National Championship 3:
 Runner-Up (3): 2007–08, 2010–11
 Third Place (3): 2011–12, 2015–16
Hungarian Regional League 1:
 Runner-Up (1): 2006–07Ukrainian Regional League: Champion (1): 2009Ukrainian Regional Cup: Runner-Up (1): 2009Ukrainian District League: Champion (1): 1999Ukrainian District Cup: Winner (1): 1999

Individual
  Cigánd SE Player Of The Year: 2011
  Szernyei Oazis FC''' Player Of The Year: 2001, 2005
Player Of The Year in Szernye: 2001, 2003, 2006, 2008

External links 
 Profile on Cigánd SE official website
 Cigánd vs. Tuzsér - Man Of The Match
 Cigánd vs. Baktalórántháza - Man Of The Match

1983 births
Living people
Ukrainian footballers
Ukrainian people of Hungarian descent
Association football midfielders
Cigánd SE players
Nyíregyháza Spartacus FC players
Mátészalka FC players
Kisvárda FC players
Sportspeople from Zakarpattia Oblast